Eshkali may refer to:
Eshkali Avaz Hoseyn, Bushehr Province
Eshkali Mohammad Hajji, Bushehr Province
Eshkali Seyyedi, Bushehr Province
Eshkali Zayer Hoseyn, Bushehr Province
Eshkali, Mazandaran